André Bucher (born 19 October 1976) is a retired Swiss 800 metres runner who ran for Adidas. He is best known for winning the gold medal at the 2001 World Championships in Edmonton in his event. Bucher also won the indoor bronze that same year. He was born in Neudorf.

Bucher won two European Championship silver medals in 1998, 2002 and also silver at the 2002 Indoor. Other achievements include finishing third at the 2003 IAAF World Athletics Final.

At the 2000 Summer Olympics in Sydney a medal was possibly chiselled out of him when he was barged into by his competitor Andrea Longo. While Bucher finished the race in fifth place, Longo was later disqualified.

On 17 August 2001, Bucher posted a personal best of 1:42.55 minutes in the 800 meters. That time currently ranks him as the 17th fastest athlete in history. On that race, he beat the young Yuriy Borzakovskiy by a decent margin. The week after, Borzakovskiy would post the time that currently makes him 12th fastest in history.

Bucher retired in May 2007 due to a long-term heel injury.

Achievements

References

1976 births
Living people
Swiss male middle-distance runners
Athletes (track and field) at the 1996 Summer Olympics
Athletes (track and field) at the 2000 Summer Olympics
Athletes (track and field) at the 2004 Summer Olympics
Olympic athletes of Switzerland
World Athletics Championships medalists
European Athletics Championships medalists
Universiade medalists in athletics (track and field)
IAAF Golden League winners
European Athlete of the Year winners
Universiade silver medalists for Switzerland
World Athletics Championships winners
Medalists at the 1999 Summer Universiade